The Naval Intelligence Department (NID) was the intelligence arm of the British Admiralty from 1887 until 1912 when most of its subsidiary divisions were absorbed during the creation of the Admiralty War Staff department that included a new Naval Intelligence Division that concentrated in that sphere solely. It dealt with intelligence matters concerning British naval plans, and with the collection of naval intelligence in regard to coastal defences, foreign powers, mobilisation, trade and war.

History
The Foreign Intelligence Committee was established in 1882 and it evolved into the Naval Intelligence Department in 1887.

The NID staff were originally responsible for fleet mobilisation and war plans as well as foreign intelligence collection; thus in the beginning there were originally two divisions: (1) intelligence (Foreign) and (2) Mobilisation. In 1900 another division, War, was added to deal with issues of strategy and defence, and in 1902 a fourth division, Trade, was created for matters related to the protection of merchant shipping. The Trade Division was abolished in October 1909 in the wake of the Committee of Imperial Defence inquiry into the feud between the First Sea Lord, Admiral Sir John Fisher and former Commander-in-Chief Channel Fleet, Admiral Lord Charles Beresford, when it was discovered that the captain heading the Trade Division had been supplying the latter with confidential information during the inquiry.

In 1910, the NID was shorn of its responsibility for war planning and strategy when the outgoing Fisher created the Navy War Council as a stop-gap remedy to criticisms emanating from the Beresford Inquiry that the Navy needed a naval staff—a role the NID had been in fact fulfilling since at least 1900, if not earlier. After this reorganisation, war planning and strategic matters were transferred to the newly created Naval Mobilisation Department and the NID reverted to the position it held prior to 1887—an intelligence collection and collation organisation.

In 1912 the department was restructured with most of its divisions and functions being absorbed within the Admiralty War Staff organisation the department was abolished and re-emerged as the Naval Intelligence Division of the new department.

Directors of Naval Intelligence
Directors of Naval Intelligence included:
 Captain William Henry Hall, 1887–1889
 Rear-Admiral Cyprian Bridge, 1889–1894
 Rear-Admiral Lewis Beaumont, 1895–1899
 Rear-Admiral Reginald Custance, 1899–1902
 Rear-Admiral Prince Louis of Battenberg, 1902–1905
 Captain Charles Ottley, 1905–1907
 Rear-Admiral Sir Edmond Slade, 1907–1909
 Rear-Admiral Alexander Bethell, 1909–1912

Assistant directors
Included:
Assistant Director Mobilisation Division
 Captain Reginald N. Custance, February, 1887 – January, 1890.
 Captain Tynte F. Hammill, January, 1890 - April, 1892.
 Captain Arthur Barrow, May, 1892 – March, 1895.
 Captain Richard W. White, April, 1895 - October 1897
 Captain Arthur Barrow, November, 1897 – 28 June 1899 
 Captain H.S.H. Prince Louis of Battenberg, June, 1899 – May, 1901.
 Captain Frederick S. Inglefield, 15 October 1902  – February, 1904.
 Captain Charles J. Briggs, 11 February 1904  –  December, 1904.
 Captain Charles L. Ottley,  December, 1904 - January 1905.
 Captain Charles L. Vaughan-Lee,  January, 1905  –  December, 1905.
 Captain Francis F. Haworth-Booth, December, 1905 – 19 March 1908.
 Captain Michael Culme-Seymour, 20 March 1908 – 11 October 1909.
Assistant Director War Division
 Captain Charles J. Briggs, March, 1900 – December, 1901.
 Captain Herbert L. Heath, January, 1902 – December, 1903 
 Captain George A. Ballard, January, 1904 – January, 1906.
 Captain Harry Jones, January, 1906 – 8 May 1907.
 Captain Osmond Brock, May, 1907 – March, 1909 
 Captain Arthur R. Hulbert, March, 1909 – October, 1909 .
Assistant Director Foreign Division
 Captain Sydney M. Eardley Wilmot, February, 1887 - March 1890.
 Captain The Hon. Maurice A. Bourke, April, 1890 – August, 1891.
 Captain The Hon. Assheton G. Curzon-Howe, August, 1891 – September, 1892.
 Captain Henry D. Barry, October, 1892 - October 1895.
 Captain Charles G. Dicken, November, 1895 – October, 1897.
 Captain Robert S. Lowry, October, 1897 - December 1899.
 Captain F. C. Doveton Sturdee, January, 1900 – 16 October 1902.
 Captain Stuart Nicholson, October, 1902 – March, 1906. 
 Captain Herbert G. King-Hall, March, 1906  – June, 1908.
 Captain William L. Grant, June, 1908 – December, 1909. 
 Captain Thomas Jackson, December, 1909 – January, 1912.
Assistant Director Trade Division
 Captain Edward F. Inglefield, September, 1901, (temporary, until 28 July 1902).
 Captain Harry Jones, 1905 – 15 January 1906.
 Captain Robert F. Scott, January, 1906, – August, 1906.
 Captain Henry H. Campbell, August, 1906 – October, 1909.
Assistant Director Coastal Defences Division

Divisions
The distribution of intelligence work within specialist divisions assigned for those tasks can be seen below.

Mobilisation division
Responsibilities included:

War division
Responsibilities included:

Foreign division
Responsibilities included:

Trade division
Responsibilities included:

Coastal defences division
Responsibilities included:

See also
 Naval Intelligence Division

References

Sources

External links
30 Commando Assault Unit - Ian Fleming's 'Red Indians'

Royal Navy